Radcliffe bus station is a bus station in Radcliffe, Greater Manchester and, in its previous form, opened in April 1984. It was situated on Dale Street in Radcliffe.

The newly constructed Radcliffe bus station is situated at the junction of the A665 (Pilkington Road) and Sion street, Radcliffe.

Present 
In December 2015 the new bus station was built and opened on its new site, behind the General Post office, following plans for Radcliffe's regeneration as outlined by Bury Council.

Services
Services are run by Go North West, Diamond North West, Tyrers & Rosso (JPT's former services are now run by Stagecoach Manchester, as of May 2014). The new station has four stands, A, B, C and D.

The services are:

3 to Bolton Wanderers F.C.,  (Match days)Stand A.

98 to Bury and Manchester, Stands A and B.

91 to Bury and Radcliffe, Stand C and B

512 to Bury and Royal Bolton Hospital, Stands A and D

513 to Bury and Farnworth, Stands A and D

524 to Bury and Bolton, Stands C and D

Future
Due to plans from Bury Council to regenerate Radcliffe Town Center, the new bus station will be joined by new shops and other amenities. The completed regeneration plan was scheduled for completion in 2016. However due to unknown delays no new building work has started as of 16 June 2018.

References

Bus stations in Greater Manchester
Radcliffe, Greater Manchester